Gordon Craig Reynolds (born December 27, 1952) is a former Major League Baseball (MLB) shortstop who was an inaugural member of the Seattle Mariners. He batted left-handed and threw right.

Early life
He was drafted out of high school by the Pittsburgh Pirates in the first round of the 1971 Major League Baseball draft.

MLB career

Pittsburgh Pirates
Reynolds batted a solid .318 in his first professional season with the Gulf Coast League Pirates, but with no power, and he committed 25 errors on the field. He spent the  season in Triple-A with the Charleston Charlies before being called up to the Pirates when rosters expanded in September.

Seattle Mariners
The Seattle Mariners selected Grant Jackson from the New York Yankees with their eleventh pick in the 1976 Major League Baseball expansion draft. A month later, they traded Jackson to the Pirates for Reynolds and Jimmy Sexton.

Reynolds immediately became the starting shortstop in Seattle, where his light hitting usually had him at or near the bottom of the Seattle batting order, however, his lack of strikeouts and ability to move runners over landed him in the second spot in the batting order early in the  season. He was batting .306 with three home runs, 29 RBI and 27 runs scored at the 1978 All-Star break to be named the Mariners' sole representative on the American League squad, but did not appear in the game. After that season, he was acquired by his hometown Houston Astros in exchange for future AL strikeout champion Floyd Bannister.

Houston Astros
After Garry Templeton declined his invitation to the 1979 All-Star Game, National League manager Tommy Lasorda added Reynolds to his team. As a result, Reynolds became the only shortstop in MLB history to be selected to the AL and NL squads in consecutive seasons. He batted .265 his first season with the Astros, but more importantly, he helped solidify the Houston infield with a .965 fielding percentage. After the season, he was presented with the Danny Thompson Memorial Award for exemplifying Christian spirit in the Major Leagues. "When you receive an award like that, you’re humbled by it," Reynolds said.

Reynolds suffered through a subpar  season, however, the Astros won their first division crown in franchise history. On May 16, Reynolds tied the major-league record with three triples in one game and led the NL with a dozen three-baggers that season. He ended the season tied for the league lead with the San Diego Padres' Gene Richards with twelve in spite of the strike-shortened season.

He played with the Houston Astros for 11 seasons, finishing second only to Roger Metzger in all-time games played at shortstop for the team.

In retirement he entered the world of wealth management in Houston, partnering with former Astros teammate Terry Puhl.

He is married to his wife Josey and has three children, Ashlyn, Kyle and Reagan.

Later life
Reynolds currently serves as a pastor at Second Baptist Church North Campus in Houston.

See also
 List of Houston Astros team records
 List of Major League Baseball annual triples leaders

Sources

External links
, or Retrosheet, or Pura Pelota (Venezuelan Winter League)

1952 births
Living people
American League All-Stars
Baseball players from Houston
Charleston Charlies players
Gastonia Pirates players
Gulf Coast Pirates players
Houston Astros players
Major League Baseball shortstops
National League All-Stars
Navegantes del Magallanes players
American expatriate baseball players in Venezuela
Pittsburgh Pirates players
Salem Pirates players
Seattle Mariners players
Thetford Mines Pirates players